Asante Samuel Jr. (born October 3, 1999) is an American football cornerback for the Los Angeles Chargers of the National Football League (NFL). He played college football at Florida State and was drafted by the Chargers in the second round of the 2021 NFL Draft. He is the son of former NFL cornerback Asante Samuel.

Early life 
Samuel was born on October 3, 1999, in Fort Lauderdale, Florida to Asante Samuel Sr. and Candice Doe. Samuel credits his grandmother, Christine Samuel, for helping raise him and being an important person in his life. When he was 14, his mother was diagnosed with a brain tumor. Following surgery, his mother recovered from the brain tumor.

High school career 
Samuel played high school football at St. Thomas Aquinas in Fort Lauderdale, Florida. He was a four-star recruit coming out of high school and committed to Florida State to play college football.

College career 
As a sophomore in 2019, Samuel was named to the third-team All-ACC team after recording 48 tackles, one interception, and 14 pass breakups. As a junior in 2020, he was named to the first-team All-ACC team.

Professional career 

Samuel was selected by the Los Angeles Chargers in the second round (47th overall) of the 2021 NFL Draft. On May 12, 2021, Samuel signed with the Chargers on a deal worth just over $7 million.

2021 season 
Samuel recorded his first career interception in week 2 against the Dallas Cowboys. He was Pepsi NFL Rookie of the Week in back-to-back weeks, weeks 2 and 3.

2022 season 
Samuel recorded his first interception of the 2022 season in week 1 against the Las Vegas Raiders. In the playoffs, Samuel recorded 3 interceptions in the first half in the team’s 31-30 loss to the Jacksonville Jaguars.

References

External links
Florida State Seminoles bio

1999 births
Living people
Players of American football from Fort Lauderdale, Florida
Samuel, Asante Jr.
American football cornerbacks
Florida State Seminoles football players
Los Angeles Chargers players